Ileana Ongar (born 24 March 1950 in Alexandria) is a former Italian hurdler, that was 8th at 1976 Summer Olympics (110 m hs) and earned four medals at the Mediterranean Games.

Biography
Ileana Ongar participated at one edition of the Summer Olympics (1976), she has 36 caps in national team from 1971 to 1978.

National records
 60 metres hurdles: 8.36 ( Milan, 10 February 1976) – holder until February  1986
 100 metres hurdles: 13.24 ( Fürth, 13 June 1976) – holder until July 1986

Progression
100 metres hurdles

Achievements

National titles
Ileana Ongar has won 12 times the individual national championship.
7 wins in 100 metres hurdles (1972, 1973, 1974, 1975, 1976, 1978)
5 wins in 60 metres hurdles indoor (1971, 1972, 1976, 1977, 1978)

See also
 Italian all-time lists – 100 metres hurdles
 Italy national relay team

References

External links
 

1950 births
Italian female hurdlers
Athletes (track and field) at the 1976 Summer Olympics
Sportspeople from Alexandria
Olympic athletes of Italy
Living people
Mediterranean Games gold medalists for Italy
Mediterranean Games silver medalists for Italy
Mediterranean Games bronze medalists for Italy
Athletes (track and field) at the 1971 Mediterranean Games
Athletes (track and field) at the 1975 Mediterranean Games
Mediterranean Games medalists in athletics
20th-century Italian women
21st-century Italian women